The Indre Sunnan Bridge is a cantilever bridge in the municipality of Bodø in Nordland county, Norway. It crosses a strait between the island of Straumøya and the village of Tuv on the mainland. The Saltstraumen strait and its famous maelstrom lie just a short distance to the northeast.

See also
List of bridges in Norway
Saltstraumen Bridge

References

External links

Buildings and structures in Bodø
Road bridges in Nordland
Roads within the Arctic Circle